Efetobore Peter "Efe" Sodje (born 5 October 1972) is a former professional footballer who played as a centre-back for several English football league clubs. He represented Nigeria in the 2000 African Cup of Nations and the 2002 World Cup.

Sodje began his career at Stevenage Borough and later played for Luton Town, Colchester United, Crewe Alexandra, Huddersfield Town, Yeovil Town, Southend United, Gillingham, Bury, Barrow and Macclesfield Town in two spells.

Career

Early career
Sodje began his career playing for Stevenage Borough in the Conference National, who he had signed for ahead of the 1994–95 season. Prior to signing for Stevenage, Sodje had unsuccessful trials at both Wimbledon and Luton Town. He featured in Stevenage's reserve side throughout August 1994, waiting for his international clearance to come through before making a first-team appearance. He eventually made his debut on 27 September 1994, starting in Stevenage's 1–0 defeat at Welling United. Sodje made a total of 33 appearances during the 1994–95 campaign, scoring once in a 5–0 win over Yeovil Town, a game in which he came off the substitutes' bench to score.
Sodje remained at Stevenage the following season, helping the club win the Conference National title, however they would be denied promotion to the Football League due to insufficient ground facilities. During the season, he made a total of 49 appearances, scoring five goals, four of which came in the league.
Sodje's third season at Stevenage was his best in goalscoring terms; he scored 7 times in 55 games in all competitions as Stevenage finished the season in third place, beaten to the title by Macclesfield Town.
Sodje left Stevenage at the end of the season to join newly promoted Football League side Macclesfield Town. He had made 138 appearances for Stevenage during his three-year spell with the side, scoring 13 goals.

Sodje scored on his Football League debut, which was also Macclesfield Town's first game in the League. He played 83 times and scored 6 goals for Macclesfield Town before he left to join Luton Town in 1999; there, he made only 9 appearances and was loaned out to Colchester United for part of the 1999–2000 season. Sodje made three appearances for Colchester before returning to Luton.

Sodje moved to Crewe Alexandra in 2000, where he made 97 league appearances over three seasons. His first goal for Crewe came in their 4–2 win over Portsmouth on 8 December 2001. During his time at Crewe Sodje was called up to the Nigeria squad for the first time in his career, and played at the 2002 FIFA World Cup in Japan.

Huddersfield Town
Sodje joined then Division 3 side Huddersfield Town, where he was made captain. His Town debut came in their 2–1 win over Derby County in the first round of the League Cup on 12 August 2003. His league debut came in their 2–2 draw with Boston United on 16 August. He scored his first goal for the Terriers came in their 2–0 home win over Boston United in January 2004. In his first season with the Terriers he helped them to the Division Three Play-off title.

Sodje was also voted into the PFA PFA Players' Division Three team of the season for the 2003–04 season

Southend United
Sodje left Southend following their relegation from the Championship in the 2006–07 season.

On 10 July 2007, he joined League One side Gillingham on a two-year deal, and made his debut in the 1–0 away defeat to Cheltenham Town on 11 August. In February 2008 he joined Bury on loan until the end of the season, and was transfer listed on 5 June 2008.

Bury
It was announced on 1 July 2008, that his contract had been terminated by Gillingham. Sodje was signed by Bury on a two-year contract as a player-coach, on 3 July 2008. At the beginning of the 2010–11 season, he was named 2nd vice-captain by Alan Knill after Ryan Lowe. In May 2011 he signed a new two-year contract extension.

He made his 500th league appearance in January 2012 playing for Bury in a 1–1 draw against Charlton Athletic.

Return to Macclesfield Town
In June 2013 Sodje returned to Macclesfield Town as assistant manager to John Askey; Sodje also registered himself as a player for the Silkmen. He left the club for undisclosed reasons in November 2015.

International career
Although born in England Sodje like his brother Sam represented Nigeria at international level. He was part of the squad that finished second to Cameroon in the 2000 African Cup of Nations.

He was also part of the Nigeria squad that went to the 2002 FIFA World Cup making two appearances against Argentina and England. So far Sodje has played 12 times, scoring once in a 2–1 friendly win against Republic of Ireland in 2002.

Personal life
Born in Greenwich, London, his family originate from Warri, in Delta State, Nigeria. Sodje is the eldest of four brothers who all play football; three of them professionally and one semi-professionally. Sam, Akpo (the youngest of the four) have both played alongside Efe. He played alongside Akpo at Huddersfield Town and he has represented Nigeria at international level with Sam. Steve, who plays semi-professionally has never played a Football League game. Another brother, Bright, used to play rugby league and rugby union. His nephew Onome Sodje has also played professionally in England.

Sodje is famous for wearing a do-rag, something he started doing in 1994 at the request of his mother. The headband often has the words "Against All Odds".

In September 2017, Sodje (along with his brothers Stephen and Bright) was sentenced to 18 months in prison for fraud, having siphoned off money from a charity, the Sodje Sports Foundation.

Career statistics

Club

Honours 
Stevenage Borough
 Football Conference: 1995–96

Macclesfield Town
 Football League Division Three runner-up: 1997–98

Crewe Alexandra
 Football League Division Three runner-up: 2002–03

Huddersfield Town
 Football League Division Three playoff winner: 2003–04

Southend United
 Football League One: 2005–06

Bury
 Football League Two runner-up: 2010–11

Individual
 PFA Team of the Year: 2003–04

References

External links

 
 Profile at Bury

1972 births
Living people
Footballers from Greenwich
English sportspeople of Nigerian descent
Citizens of Nigeria through descent
English footballers
Nigerian footballers
Association football central defenders
Stevenage F.C. players
Macclesfield Town F.C. players
Luton Town F.C. players
Colchester United F.C. players
Crewe Alexandra F.C. players
Huddersfield Town A.F.C. players
Yeovil Town F.C. players
Southend United F.C. players
Gillingham F.C. players
Bury F.C. players
Bury F.C. non-playing staff
Barrow A.F.C. players
Macclesfield Town F.C. non-playing staff
Association football coaches
English Football League players
National League (English football) players
Nigeria international footballers
2000 African Cup of Nations players
2002 FIFA World Cup players
English criminals
Nigerian criminals
British people convicted of fraud
Prisoners and detainees of England and Wales